Eslamabad-e Ghurak (also Romanized as Eslāmābād-e Ghūrak; also known as Eslāmābād) is a village in Babuyi Rural District, Basht District, Basht County, Kohgiluyeh and Boyer-Ahmad Province, Iran. At the 2006 census, its population was 109, in 21 families.

References 

Populated places in Basht County